The Premier Builders Guild was a Pennsylvania-based organization that assisted small manufacturers of boutique guitars and amplifiers in producing and marketing their products. The group was founded by Michael Bernstein in 2009 in Arroyo Grande, California, and was brought to an end in 2016.

Brands associated with the guild include Fano Guitars, Tone King, Two-Rock Amplifiers, Gjika Amplification, and guitars by Gene Baker, Jason Z. Schroeder, Roger Giffin, Saul Koll, and Johan Gustavsson.

References

Companies based in Pittsburgh